Pipe fitting may refer to:
 The work of pipefitters, who install or repair piping or tubing systems
 Piping and plumbing fittings, adapters used in pipe systems